Buzh Mehran (also Romanized as Būzh Mehrān and Būzhmehrān) is a village in Ordughesh Rural District, Zeberkhan District, Nishapur County, Razavi Khorasan Province, Iran. At the 2006 census, its population was 1,744, in 477 families.

References 

Populated places in Nishapur County